Placenticeras is a genus of ammonites from the Late Cretaceous. Its fossils have been found in Asia, Europe, North and South America.

Taxonomy
Placenticeras, named by Fielding Bradford Meek, 1870, is the type genus for the Placenticeratidae, a family that is part of the Hoplitoidea, a superfamily of the Ammonitida.

Description
Placenticeras has a very involute shell with slightly convex sides and a very narrow venter. Side are smooth or with faint sinuous ribs. Early whorls have umbilical tubercles that in later whorls appear higher on the sides. Earlier whorls normally have lower and fine upper ventrolateral clavi. Ornament weakens in the adult and the last whorl may be smooth. The suture is with numerous adventitious and auxiliary elements, with saddles and lobes that are much frilled.

Species

Species list according to :
 Placenticeras bidorsatum
 Placenticeras costatum  
 Placenticeras cumminsi
 Placenticeras fritschi 
 Placenticeras grossouvrei
 Placenticeras intercalare
 Placenticeras kolbajense
 Placenticeras maherndli
 Placenticeras mediasiaticum
 Placenticeras memoriaschloenbachi 
 Placenticeras meeki
 Placenticeras orbignyanum
 Placenticeras paraplanum
 Placenticeras placenta
 Placenticeras polyopsis
 Placenticeras pseudoplacenta
 Placenticeras semiornatum
 Placenticeras syrtale (syn. Stantonoceras pseudocostatum)
 Placenticeras tamulicum
 Placenticeras vredenburgi
 Placenticeras whitfieldi

References

 Arkell et al., 1957,  Mesozoic Ammonoidea, Treatise on Invertebrate Paleontology Part L.  Geological Soc. of America, Univ of Kansas Press. R.C. Moore, (Ed)
 W. A. Cobban and Hook, S. C. 1983 Mid-Cretaceous (Turonian) ammonite fauna from Fence Lake area of west-central New Mexico. Memoir 41, New Mexico Bureau of Mines&Mineral Resources, Socorro NM.
 W. A. Cobban and Hook, S. C. 1979, Collignoniceras woollgari wooollgari (Mantell) ammonite fauna from Upper Cretaceous of Western Interior, United States. Memoir 37, New Mexico Bureau of Mines&Mineral Resources, Socorro NM.
 Discovering Fossils: How to Find and Identify Remains of the Prehistoric Past (Fossils & Dinosaurs) by Frank A. Garcia, Donald S. Miller, and Jasper Burns
 Placenticeras in the Paleobiology Database

Placenticeratidae
Ammonitida genera
Late Cretaceous ammonites
Cretaceous animals of Asia
Ammonites of Europe
Ammonites of North America
Ammonites of South America